Greensville is a community in Flamborough, Hamilton in the Canadian province of Ontario.

Hamilton Conservation Authority attractions Webster's Falls and Tew's Falls are in Greensville.

Well-known Canadian philanthropist and Hamilton Sports Hall of Fame member, Charles Juravinski and his wife Margaret are Greensville residents.

Jamaican Canadian billionaire Michael Lee-Chin was also at one time a Greensville Resident.

See also

List of communities in Ontario

Neighbourhoods in Hamilton, Ontario